In mathematics, the moduli stack of elliptic curves, denoted as  or , is an algebraic stack over  classifying elliptic curves. Note that it is a special case of the moduli stack of algebraic curves . The construction of this space spans over a century because of the various generalizations of elliptic curves as the field has developed.

Properties

Smooth Deligne-Mumford stack 

j-invariant 

Construction over the complex numbers 
Given a basis for its integral homology  and a global holomorphic differential form  (which exists since it is smooth and the dimension of the space of such differentials is equal to the genus, 1), the integralsgive the generators for a -lattice of rank 2 inside of  pg 158. In this case, the points in  having only trivial stabilizers are dense.

Stacky/Orbifold points 

Representing involutions of plane curves 
Given a plane curve by its Weierstrass equationand a solution , generically for j-invariant , there is the -involution sending . In the special case of a curve with complex multiplicationthere the -involution sending . The other special case is when , so a curve of the for there is the -involution sending  where  is the third root of unity .

Fundamental domain and visualization 
There is a subset of the upper-half plane called the Fundamental domain which contains every isomorphism class of elliptic curves. It is the subsetIt is useful to consider this space because it helps visualize the stack . Also, the points on the boundary can be identified with their mirror image under the involution sending , so  can be visualized as the projective curve  with a point removed at infinitypg 52.

Line bundles and modular functions 
There are line bundles  over the moduli stack  whose sections correspond to modular functions  on the upper-half plane . On  there are -actions compatible with the action on  given byThe degree  action is given byhence the trivial line bundle  with the degree  action descends to a unique line bundle denoted .

Modular forms 
The modular forms are the modular functions which can be extended to the compactificationthis is because in order to compactify the stack , a point at infinity must be added, which is done through a gluing process by gluing the -disk (where a modular function has its -expansion)pgs 29-33.

Universal curves 
Combining these two actions together yields the quotient stack

Versal curve 

SL2-action on Z2 
This action is given bywhich is matrix multiplication on the right, so

See also 

 Fundamental domain
 Homothety
 Level structure (algebraic geometry)
 Moduli of abelian varieties
Shimura variety
Modular curve
Elliptic cohomology

References

External links

Algebraic geometry